Danielle Nicole Gant (born March 6, 1987 in Cleveland, Ohio) is a women's college basketball guard/forward. She was drafted 16th overall by the Chicago Sky in the 2009 WNBA Draft. She played college ball for Texas A&M.

Honors and awards
2008–09 Team Captain
Two-Time All-Big 12 First Team by league's coaches (2008, 2009)
Two-Time State Farm All-America Regional Finalist (2008, 2009)
Three-Time Big 12 All-Defensive Team (2007,2008 and 2009)
2009 Big 12 Defensive Player of the Year
Two-Time Big 12 Player of the Week selection (Feb. 25, 2008 and March 3, 2008)
2008 All-Big 12 First Team by the Waco Tribune-Herald
2008 All-Big 12 Second Team by The Dallas Morning News
The 21st all-time player to reach 1,000 career points at A&M
The 17th all-time player to gain entrance into the 500 Rebound Club at A&M
Named WBCA National Player of the Month Honorable Mention selection for the month of December 2007
2007 Paradise Jam St. John Division All-Tournament Team
Texas A&M's NCAA Tournament Single Game Record Holder In Points (24) and Rebounds (14)
2007 All-Big 12 Second Team by league's coaches
2007 All-Big 12 Second Team by the Waco Tribune
2007 Big 12 Defensive Player of the Year by the Waco Tribune
2007 All-Big 12 Second Team by The Dallas Morning News
2007 Big 12 Sixth Man Award by league's coaches
2005 Hawaiian Airlines Rainbow Wahine Classic All-Tournament Team

Texas A&M statistics
Source

Reference:

References

External links
Texas A&M bio

1987 births
Living people
American women's basketball players
Basketball players from Cleveland
Chicago Sky draft picks
Forwards (basketball)
Guards (basketball)
Texas A&M Aggies women's basketball players